The Great Roxhythe is a novel written by Georgette Heyer. The book opens in 1668 and closes in 1685, and concerns the misadventures of a fictional spy loyal to Charles II.

External links
 The full text of The Great Roxhythe at the Internet Archive

1923 British novels
Novels by Georgette Heyer
Historical novels
Hutchinson (publisher) books
Novels set in the 17th century